Terry Grimwood (formerly Terry Gates-Grimwood) is a British writer of horror and science fiction. He publishes The Exaggerated Press. He has written and directed three plays, and is married to Regional Director Debra Wilkins.<refSee biography: >http://69flavorsofparanoia.com/BIOGALLERY/menu5VIP.html#TerryGrimwood</ref>

Bibliography

Books

 Demons and Demons (chapbook, D-Press, 2004)
 The Exaggerated Man and other stories, Exaggerated Press, 2008. .
 The Places Between, Pendragon Press, 2010.
 Bloody War, Eibonvale Press, 2010.
 Axe, Double Dragon eBooks, 2012. .
 There is a Way to Live Forever, Black Shuck Books, 2017.
 Skin for Skin, Luna Press, 2021.
 Interference, Elsewhen Press, 2022.

Short stories
(not including reprints)

 John (Peeping Tom 24, 1996)
 The Friends of Mike Santini (Nemonymous one, 2001)
 The Last Knight of Llanth (Legend, 6 & 7, 2002-2003)
 Red Hands (Darkness Rising 7, 2003)
 Chemo (Nemonymous three, 2003)
 Coffin Dream (Midnight Street 2, 2004)
 What the Dead are For (The Future Fire 2, 2005)
 Breathe (Apex Digest, 2005)
 Mikki (Whispers of Wickedness, Spring 2005)
 Soul Money (Dark Animus 7, 2005)
 The Exaggerated Man (The Future Fire 4, 2005)
 Atoner (Whispers of Wickedness 11, 2005)
 Nobody Walks in London (ParaSpheres Anthology, 2006)
 An Indescribable Horror (Whispers of Wickedness 14, 2007)
 Coffin Road (The Future Fire 8, 2007)
 Kemistry (The Future Fire 12, 2008)
 The Stalker (Twisted Tongue 9, 2008)
 The Contractor (The Future Fire 16, 2009)
 NM (Bare Bone 11)
 The Devil's Egg (Murky Depths 13, 2009)
 Ashes of the Phoenix (Twisted Tongue 14, 2009)

As editor

 The Monster Book for Girls, Exaggerated Press, 2011. .
 Wordland, e-zine

Plays

 The Bayonet (premiered 1994)
 Tattletale Mary (premiered 1996)
 Tales from the Nightside (premiered 2005)
 Pyewackett and Vinegar Tom (unperformed)

References

English horror writers
English science fiction writers
English dramatists and playwrights
Living people
English male dramatists and playwrights
English male novelists
English male non-fiction writers
Year of birth missing (living people)